The 38th TCA Awards were presented on August 6, 2022. The nominees were announced by the Television Critics Association on June 16, 2022.

Winners and nominees

Shows with multiple nominations

The following shows received multiple nominations:

Shows with multiple wins

The following shows received multiple wins:

References

External links
 Official website

2022 television awards
2022 in American television
TCA Awards ceremonies
August 2022 events in the United States